Abū ʿAmr ʿĀmir ibn Sharāḥīl ibn ʿAbd al-Kūfī al-Shaʿbī, 641–723, commonly known as Imam al-Sha'bi or al-Sha'bi, was an Arab historian and jurist, as well as an appreciated Tabi'un, born in the caliphate of Umar ibn al-Khattab.

Despite being his own Islamic opposition to the use of fiqh in religious speculation, which is very different from the Qur'an and the Sunnah built on Muhammad's thoughts and customs of life, his views have been widely accepted. al-Sha’bi has been appointed among the first jurists of leading Islamic law, including ʽAbd al-Razzaq al-Sanʽani and Ibn Abi Shaybah.

Biography 
Al-Sha'bi was of the leading Muslim chronicler who focused on narratives on the Islamic history discipline of Maghazi (expeditions and conquests). His narrations are scattered in many books. His narration style were greatly religious driven.

Al-Sha'bi gained huge reputation that caliph ʿAbd al-Malik ibn Marwan entrusted him with the education of his children. 

Al-Sha'bi were described as physically skinny.

Works 
Al-Shabi based his opinion on Abdullah ibn Abbas regarding the Fiqh ruling of Hermaphrodite people or Khunta Al-Mushkal gets half of the inheritance from their parents a combined shares (both as male and female), hence making it as equal of normal people. Hanbali and Shafii schools also taking al-Sha'bi approach if a gender of a person cannot be described.

See also 
 Al-Shafi'i
 Ahmad ibn Hanbal
 Urwah ibn Zubayr

References

Tabi‘un
Tabi‘un hadith narrators
Historians of the medieval Islamic world
Historians
8th-century people from the Umayyad Caliphate
Sunni imams
People from the Rashidun Caliphate
Sunni Muslim scholars of Islam
8th-century Muslim theologians